In physics, X-waves are localized solutions of the wave equation that travel at a constant velocity in a given direction. X-waves can be sound, electromagnetic, or gravitational waves. They are built as a non-monochromatic superposition of Bessel beams. Ideal X-waves carry infinite energy, but finite-energy realizations have been observed in various frameworks. Electromagnetic X-waves travel faster than the speed of light, and X-wave pulses can have superluminal phase and group velocity.

In optics, X-waves solution have been reported within a quantum mechanical formulation.

See also 
 Nonlinear X-wave
 Droplet-shaped wave

References

 J. Lu and J. F. Greenleaf, "Nondiffracting X waves: exact solutions to free-space scalar wave equation and their infinite realizations", IEEE Trans. Ultrasonic Ferroelectric Frequency. Control 39, 19–31 (1992).
 Erasmo Recami and Michel Zamboni-Rached and Hugo E. Hernandez-Figueroa, "Localized waves: A scientific and historical introduction" arxiv.org 0708.1655v2.
 Various authors in the book Localized Waves edited by Erasmo Recami, Michel Zamboni-Rached and Hugo E. Hernandez-Figueroa

External links 
 The Virtual Institute for Nonlinear Optics (VINO), a research collaboration devoted to the investigation of X-waves and conical waves in general
 Nolinear X-waves page at the nlo.phys.uniroma1.it website.

Wave mechanics